Levi Hutchins (August 17, 1761 – June 13, 1855) was an American clockmaker, and inventor of the first American alarm clock.

Hutchins was born in Harvard, Massachusetts, to Gordon and Holly Hutchins. In April 1775, during the American Revolutionary War, he served as a fifer under his father's command and witnessed the burning of Charlestown, Massachusetts. In September 1775, he enlisted in Captain Lewis' Company, in Colonel Varnum's Regiment, under General Greene. He marched to New York in the spring of 1776, where he was posted in Brooklyn. As Hutchins writes in his autobiography:

"During this time, my fellow-soldiers and I desired to obtain something to eat besides the salt provisions supplied by Government. With this end in view, we went one day to a pond near by, and obtained from it a quantity of clams and oysters. It proved, however, that they were private property, and had been planted in a cove. The owner, seeing us in the act of appropriating his property to our use, made a complaint against us. On returning to our quarters with our booty, we were arrested by police officers, who compelled us to carry it back. Having obeyed the command, we were sent for a short time to the guard-house, which ended the whole matter. This was the only punishment I received while with the army ; but truth compels me to add, that my comrades and I often helped ourselves to musk and water-melons that grew in profusion on patches of ground in Brooklyn."

He was later posted to Red Hook, where he remained until the end of his enlisted year in September 1777, after which he returned to his family in Concord, New Hampshire. He attended Byfield Academy for one year and Phillips Academy, Andover, for two quarters. He was then recruited as a school teacher and taught in the towns of Tewksbury, Pembroke, and Ashburnham, Massachusetts. On December 6, 1777, Hutchins and his brother Abel became apprentices of Simon Willard. After three years of indenture, they traveled to Abington, Connecticut, to serve a further eight-month apprenticeship in the watch repairs. Shortly after, the two brothers returned to Concord, New Hampshire, to set up shop on Main Street. In 1787 Hutchins created the first American alarm clock. It was housed in a  wooden cabinet with mirrored doors, and had an extra gear that rang an attached bell at 4 a.m.

On February 23, 1789, Levi married Phoebe Hanaford, with whom he had ten children. In 1793 the brothers purchased a farm together, where they farmed and continued to manufacture clocks. In 1807, as they dissolved their partnership, Hutchins received the farm. In about 1815, Levi built a large building and set up five looms to manufacture cloth; this business lasted three years before it was sold off. Hutchins continued to build brass clocks, as well as surveying compasses and other precision instruments, for an additional 20 years.

References 
 The Autobiography of Levi Hutchins, with a Preface, Notes, and Addenda, by His Youngest Son, Riverside Press, Cambridge, 1865. Full text
 Levi and Abel Hutchins, Clockmakers, Charles S. Parsons.
 The American clock: a comprehensive pictorial survey, 1723-1900, with a listing of 6153 clockmakers, William H. Distin, Robert Charles Bishop, Dutton, 1976, page 97.
 Historical New Hampshire, New Hampshire Historical Society, 1990, page 30.
 Delaney Antique Clocks article
 Find-a-Grave article
 NH Magazine article
 CowHampshire article

American clockmakers
American inventors
1761 births
1855 deaths
People from Harvard, Massachusetts
Phillips Academy alumni
The Governor's Academy alumni